Fujairah Football Club is an Emirati professional football club in Fujairah. Founded in 1968, the club competes in the UAE Pro-League.

Current squad
As of UAE First Division League:

Out on loan

Managerial history

 Hassan Shehata (2000)
 Ion Ion (2002–03)
 Abdul Wahab Qadir (2003–05)
 Lotfi Benzarti (2006–2008)
 Sufian Al Haidousi (2009)
 Khaled Eid (2009–10)
 Džemal Hadžiabdić (2010–11)
 Paulo Campos (2012–13)
  Stefano Cusin (2013)
 Džemal Hadžiabdić (2013–14)
 Abdul Wahab Qadir (2014)
 Ivan Hašek (2014–16)
 Eid Baroot (2016)
 Džemal Hadžiabdić (2016–17)
 Tarek Mostafa (2017)
 Diego Maradona (2017–2018)
 Ivan Hašek (2018–2019)
 Madjid Bougherra (2019–2020)
 Fabio Viviani (2019–2020)
 Goran Tufegdžić (2020–2021)
 Nassif Al Bayawi (2021)
 Mohammed Al-Timoumi (2021–2022)
 Soufiane Nechma (2022)
 Mohammed Al Hosani (2022–present)

Pro-League record

Notes 2019–20 UAE football season was cancelled due to the COVID-19 pandemic in the United Arab Emirates.

Key
 Pos. = Position
 Tms. = Number of teams
 Lvl. = League

Honours
UAE First Division League
Winner (3): 1985–86, 1989–90, 2005–06

References

External links
Official website

1968 establishments in the Trucial States
Association football clubs established in 1968
Fujairah
Sport in the Emirate of Fujairah
Organisations based in the Emirate of Fujairah